Rabal is a civil parish in the municipality of Bragança, Portugal. The population in 2011 was 171, in an area of 23.37 km².

References

Parishes of Bragança, Portugal